The Connaught Type D is a series of prototype sports cars, designed, developed, and built by British manufacturer Connaught, between 2006 and 2007.

References

Sports cars
2000s cars
Cars of England